Sheffield is a town in Berkshire County, Massachusetts, United States. It is part of the Pittsfield, Massachusetts, Metropolitan Statistical Area. The population was 3,327 at the 2020 census. Sheffield is home to Berkshire School, a private preparatory school. The former resort town includes the village of Ashley Falls, and is bordered by various other towns and villages, such as Egremont and Great Barrington. Its southern border is the Massachusetts-Connecticut state line,

History

The land was purchased on April 25, 1724, from Chief Konkapot and 20 other Stockbridge Mahican Native Americans. Its price was 460 pounds, 3 barrels of cider and 30 quarts of rum. The lower township of Housatonic (as Outhotonnook would be corrupted) was first settled by Matthew Noble of Westfield, who arrived in 1725.

But New York claimed the land west of the Housatonic River under the Westenhook Patent, dated July 11, 1705, and insisted that Massachusetts cease encroachment. Indeed, one early settler was arrested and incarcerated at Albany as a trespasser on Westenhook land. Nevertheless, Sheffield, Massachusetts, was officially incorporated on June 22, 1733, the first town incorporated in what is now Berkshire County. Its north parish was set off and incorporated as Great Barrington in 1761. Located on the fertile floodplain of the Housatonic River valley, the principal industry was agriculture.

The Sheffield Resolves, or Sheffield Declaration, was an early Colonial American petition against British rule and manifesto for individual rights, drawn up as a series of resolves approved by the Town of Sheffield on January 12, 1773, and printed in The Massachusetts Spy, Or, Thomas's Boston Journal on February 18, 1773. Sheffield was also the site of the bloodiest (and last) battle on February 27, 1787, during Shays' Rebellion.

Geography
Sheffield is located along the southern border of the county and state, north of Litchfield County, Connecticut. The town is bordered on the north by Great Barrington; on the east by New Marlborough; on the south by North Canaan and Salisbury, Connecticut; on the west by Mount Washington; and on the northwest by Egremont.

The town is in the Housatonic River valley and several brooks as well as the Konkapot River flow into the river within the town's borders, with several falls along these rivers, including Ashley Falls near the state border. To the northeast, the peak of East Mountain lies just over the Great Barrington border, and the mountain's south slope and part of its state forest lie within town borders. Several hills also dot the area south of this, along the New Marlborough town line. To the west, Mount Everett, part of the Taconic Range, peaks in the town of Mount Washington and slopes eastward into the town. Part of the Mount Everett State Reservation and Mount Washington State Forest also crosses into town. The Appalachian Trail crosses the northern third of town as it heads north from Mount Everett to East Mountain.

Sheffield lies along U.S. Route 7, which divides the town roughly in half. The southernmost section of Massachusetts Route 7A lies within the town, starting between the town center and Ashley Falls and extending over the Connecticut state border as an unnumbered road before reconnecting with the highway. Massachusetts Route 41 also ends at the town's southern border, heading from Egremont along the western part of town to the state border, where it becomes Connecticut Route 41. The town also lies along the Housatonic Railroad line, which extends autumn service between New York and Great Barrington along a line of the MTA. Otherwise, Amtrak service can be reached in Pittsfield, and bus service can be reached in Great Barrington. The nearest small airport can be found in Great Barrington, and the nearest national air service is at Bradley International Airport in Windsor Locks, Connecticut.

Demographics

As of the census of 2010, there were 3,257 people, 1,424 households, and 879 families residing in the town. By population, Sheffield ranked tenth out of the 32 cities and towns in Berkshire County, and 269th out of 351 cities and towns in Massachusetts. The racial makeup of the town was 95.8% White, 1.1% African American, 0.2% Native American, 0.3% Asian, 1.3% from other races, and 1.3% from two or more races. Hispanic or Latino of any race were 3.2% of the population.

There were 1,424 households, out of which 24.8% had children under the age of 18 living with them, 49.8% were married couples living together, 7.7% had a female householder with no husband present, and 38.3% were non-families. 31.1% of all households were made up of individuals, and 13.3% had someone living alone who was 65 years of age or older.  The average household size was 2.28 and the average family size was 2.87.

In the town, the population was spread out, with 18.9% under the age of 18, 6.1% from 18 to 24, 19.7% from 25 to 44, 35.9% from 45 to 64, and 19.4% who were 65 years of age or older.  The median age was 48 years. For every 100 females, there were 94.8 males.  For every 100 females age 18 and over, there were 96.2 males.

In 2000, the median income for a household in the town was $45,082, and the median income for a family was $50,944. Males had a median income of $36,016 versus $25,833 for females. The per capita income for the town was $25,492.  About 3.9% of families and 5.3% of the population were below the poverty line, including 3.3% of those under age 18 and 4.7% of those age 65 or over.  (Data is not yet available for 2010.)

Government

Sheffield employs the open town meeting form of government, and is led by a board of selectmen and a town administrator. The town operates its own services, including police, fire and public works departments, as well as a senior center and animal control officers. The town library, the Bushnell-Sage Library, was founded in 1901 and is connected to the regional library system. The nearest hospital, Fairview Hospital, is located in neighboring Great Barrington.

On the state level, Sheffield is represented in the Massachusetts House of Representatives by the Fourth Berkshire district, which covers southern Berkshire County, as well as the westernmost towns in Hampden County. In the Massachusetts Senate, the town is represented by the Berkshire, Hampshire and Franklin district, which includes all of Berkshire County and western Hampshire and Franklin counties. The town is patrolled by the First (Lee) Station of Barracks "B" of the Massachusetts State Police.

On the national level, Sheffield is represented in the United States House of Representatives as part of Massachusetts's 1st congressional district, and has been represented by Richard Neal of Springfield, Massachusetts since 2013. Massachusetts is currently represented in the United States Senate by senior Senator Elizabeth Warren and junior Senator Ed Markey.

Education
Sheffield is part of the Mount Everett Regional School District along with Alford, Egremont, Monterey, Mount Washington, and New Marlborough. Students in these five towns can attend South Egremont School for Pre-K, New Marlborough Central School for Pre-k-grade 3, and Undermountain Elementary School in Sheffield for Pre-K-grade 5. Mount Everett Regional High School, also in Sheffield, is the middle school and high school serving grades 7–12. The school's athletics teams are known as the Eagles, and the school colors are blue and gold. The town is also home to the Berkshire School, a private, co-educational boarding school serving grades nine through twelve. There are also other private schools in Great Barrington.

The nearest community college is the South County Center of Berkshire Community College in Great Barrington. The nearest state college is Westfield State University. The nearest private college is Bard College at Simon's Rock in Great Barrington.

Sites of interest
 Bartholomew's Cobble
 Berkshire School
 Colonel John Ashley House
 Dewey Memorial Hall
 Old Covered Bridge
 Sheffield Historical Society & Museum
 Shays Rebellion Memorial Monument

Notable people

 Ethan Allen, revolutionary
 Daniel D. Barnard, US congressman
 Frederick Augustus Porter Barnard, scientist and educator
 John G. Barnard, army engineering officer
 Emma Curtiss Bascom, educator, suffragist and reformer
 John C. Crosby, politician
 Sidney Curtiss, politician
 Charles Dewey, Justice of the Indiana Supreme Court
 Orville Dewey, minister
 Grandison Fairchild, college founder
 Elizabeth Freeman, enslaved woman known as "Mum Bett," who sued and won her freedom in 1781
 John Z. Goodrich, politician
 Sophia Curtiss Hoffman, philanthropist
 Wanda Toscanini Horowitz, daughter of Arturo Toscanini and widow of Vladimir Horowitz
 Stephen Jacob, Justice of the Vermont Supreme Court
 David Joyce, industrialist
 Charles Kellogg, congressman
 George Frederick Root, songwriter
 Luella Dowd Smith (1847–1941), writer

References

 History of Great Barrington & Sheffield, Massachusetts
 Lillian E. Preiss, Sheffield, Frontier Town, published by the Sheffield Bicentennial Committee at North Adams, Massachusetts 1976

External links

 Town of Sheffield official website

 
Towns in Berkshire County, Massachusetts
Towns in Massachusetts